This is a list of football (soccer) clubs in Saint Pierre and Miquelon.

 A.S. Ilienne Amateur
 A.S. Miquelonnaise
 A.S. Saint Pierraise

Saint Pierre and Miquelon
 
Football clubs